is a platform game developed by Japanese software company SNK. It was released in 1987. It is a distant sequel to Athena, released a year earlier, featuring a late descendant of that game's main character. Ocean Software on their Imagine label released home computer versions of the game for the ZX Spectrum, Commodore 64 and Amstrad in 1987.

Gameplay

Psycho Soldier is an action sidescroller. Rocks and other destructible objects sometimes hold power-ups. Players utilize a special force known as "Psycho Energy" to perform a number of attacks, including creating a shield of rotating spheres around the character's body to protect them. The amount of Psycho Energy is measured by the energy bar located to the left of the player's available spheres, and can be increased by obtaining certain items. Players can launch the spheres out at enemies and destructible objects at the cost of using one. Depending on how much energy the player has, the spheres may produce a different result when used, such as bouncing around the screen or, when at max energy and swirling at a higher speed around the player, spreading out and destroy everything in their wake at the cost of some power.

Both Athena and Kensou share the same abilities, and whichever one the player chooses has no real bearing on the difficulty of the game. If the player fills their energy bar and collects a special item resembling a green egg, their character transforms into a "Psycho Creature", in Athena's case a phoenix and for Kensou a green dragon. The psycho creatures have a powerful fire breath attack that hits enemies in front of them and a move which rams them into a single nearby enemy. The transformations last until the boss of the stage is defeated or until the player runs out of energy from taking too many hits.

Plot
Psycho Soldier takes place many years after Athena. In Athena, the title character is a mystical figure loosely based on the goddess of Greek mythology who fights her way through several otherworldly lands in order to destroy various monsters and evil beings who threaten the peace of the land. After her journey is complete, she returns to heaven, only to fade completely from the minds of the mortals who live below.

In the modern times of Psycho Soldier, a young girl named Athena Asamiya, who is the descendant of the original Athena, displays special psychic abilities that allow her to unlock a number of hidden powers within herself, and hopes to one day use these skills not only to help others, but to advance her stage career as a future pop idol. Several evil beings appear in her hometown in Japan, and along with her friend and fellow gifted psychic Sie Kensou, she uses her talents to protect her friends and home from this new menace.

Soundtrack
The vocals were provided by Japanese pop idol Kaori Shimizu. The Japanese and English versions of the game have different vocals for the main song.

The Japanese version of the song was released as a single in 1987 on a special cassette that was available only to those who purchased the Nintendo Famicom version of Athena in Japanese retail stores. The cassette also includes a special vocal version of the ending theme.

The Japanese version of the theme song (sans vocals) became the theme song for the Psycho Soldiers team in The King of Fighters '94 and The King of Fighters '96. It also serves as Athena's individual character theme in The King of Fighters '97 and The King of Fighters 2002.

A cover of the theme song was added to the 2018 crossover fighting game Super Smash Bros. Ultimate, performed in both English and Japanese by Kanako Kotera. This is notable for being the first time the song's English lyrics have been officially used since Psycho Soldiers US release.

Reception

In Japan, Game Machine listed Psycho Soldier on their April 15, 1987 issue as being the seventh most-successful table arcade unit of the month.

The ZX Spectrum version was published in 1987 by Imagine Software, and was converted by Ross Harris (as Source Software). This port received moderate critical success. Your Sinclair awarded it 8 out of 10, praising the smooth sprite movement and well-tried formula gameplay, but lamenting the monochrome graphics and weak sound effects. CRASH awarded it 69% and 75%, one reviewer criticising the boring gameplay and Athena's slow reactions.

Legacy
Both Athena and Kensou have been seen in other games. The character of Kensou was at the same time introduced as a teammate for Athena in The King of Fighters series as Sie Kensou and underwent several cosmetic changes (in previews of The King of Fighters XII, Athena can be seen wearing her winter school uniform from Psycho Soldier) as well as reworking his abilities to differentiate him from Athena. The version of Kensou seen in this game, however, has made a cameo in one of the special endings in The King of Fighters '97. He was also featured in The King of Fighters 2000 in his original costume as a special striker called "Psycho Soldier Kensou". This version of Kensou also appears in the recent SNK vs. Capcom: Card Fighters DS trading card game as an SNK character card. The characters Kensou and Athena, as well as the items Psycho Armor and Psycho Shield both appear in the game Crystalis for the NES, a post-apocalyptic role-playing video game. Also, Athena and Kensou wear their Psycho Soldier outfits in The King of Fighters XII as their default outfits. Ever since KOF XIIs release, The King of Fighters XIII default outfit of Kensou was left unchanged. Athena's Psycho Soldier outfit was changed from default to alternate, leaving her more popular sailor fuku outfit as her default outfit for the game.

Both Athena and Sie Kensou were also noted for being one of the first video game characters to have their own theme songs (which The King of Fighters would remix multiple times across its titles).

Athena appears in Super Smash Bros. Ultimate as a background character in the King of Fighters stage, which was released alongside Terry Bogard from Fatal Fury in November 2019. Athena is also present as a collectible Spirit in the game.

References

External links

Psycho Soldier screenshots
Zzap 64 review of Psycho Soldier

1986 video games
Amstrad CPC games
Arcade video games
Athena games
Commodore 64 games
Nintendo Switch games
PlayStation Network games
PlayStation 4 games
SNK games
SNK Playmore games
ZX Spectrum games
Video games about psychic powers
Video games featuring female protagonists
Video games developed in Japan
Hamster Corporation games